Khuen (or Khün) may refer to:

 Khuen people, an aboriginal ethnic group of Laos, or their language
 Khün language (or Tai Khün), a language of Burma
 Dok Khuen
 Khmuic languages (Khmu’, Khuen)
 Kuan (disambiguation)
 Khün Khürtü, a music group from Tuva
 Khuen von Belasi, an Austrian noble family of the county of Tyrol
 Johannes Khuen (1606 - 1675)
 Count Károly Khuen-Héderváry

See also 
 Kühn (disambiguation)
 Kuhn